Inge Hansen-Schaberg (born 11 March 1954) is a German educational researcher.

Life 
She then worked at a West Berlin primary and secondary school until 1989. Hansen-Schaberg was awarded a doctorate in 1991 with her dissertation Minna Specht – eine Sozialistin in der Landerziehungsheimbewegung (1918–1951). Untersuchung zur pädagogischen Biographie einer Reformpädagogin. at the TU Berlin and his habilitation in 1998 at the University of Potsdam.

She became a private lecturer at the Institute of Educational Science at the TU Berlin in 1998. In 2003, she was appointed as an extraordinary professor. Her work focuses on 20th century education, girls' education and coeducation, pedagogical biographies and childhood, youth and school in exile. She conducts research on the Austrian pedagogue Ernst Papanek.

Hansen-Schaberg has been head of the working group "Women in Exile" in the "Society for Exile Research" since 2001 and has been its deputy chairman since 2005.

Hansen-Schaberg is involved as a citizen at her place of residence in Rotenburg (Wümme) as chairperson of the sponsoring association "" e.V., Jewish Museum and Cultural Workshop.

Publications 
 Minna Specht – Eine Sozialistin in der Landerziehungsheimbewegung (1918 bis 1951). Untersuchung zur pädagogischen Biographie einer Reformpädagogin. Frankfurt : Lang, 1992, 
 Rückkehr und Neuanfang. Die Wirkungsmöglichkeiten der Pädagoginnen Olga Essig, Katharina Petersen und Minna Specht im westlichen Deutschland der Nachkriegszeit. In Jahrbuch für Historische Bildungsforschung, vol. 1 (1993), 
 (ed.): "etwas erzählen". Die lebensgeschichtliche Dimension in der Pädagogik. Bruno Schonig zum 60. Geburtstag. Baltmannsweiler 1997
 with Beate Schmeichel-Falkenberg (ed.): Frauen erinnern : Widerstand, Verfolgung, Exil, 1933–1945, Tagungsband, Berlin : Weidler, 2000
 with Bruno Schonig (ed.): Reformpädagogische Schulkonzepte, vol. 5: Freinet-Pädagogik. Baltmannsweiler : Schneider, 2002 
 with Bruno Schonig: Basiswissen Pädagogik. Reformpädagogische Schulkonzepte vol. 6: Waldorf-Pädagogik. Baltmannsweiler : Schneider, 2002 
 (ed.): Als Kind verfolgt : Anne Frank und die anderen. Berlin : Weidler, 2004 
 with Christian Ritzi (ed.): Wege von Pädagoginnen vor und nach 1933. Baltmannsweiler : Schneider, 2004 
 Ethik der Erinnerung in der Praxis. 2005
 Familiengeschichte(n). Erfahrungen und Verarbeitung von Exil und Verfolgung im Leben der Töchter. 2006
 Das Politische wird persönlich – Familiengeschichte(n). 2007
 with Hiltrud Häntzschel (ed.): Politik – Parteiarbeit – Pazifismus in der Emigration : Frauen handeln. Munich : edition text + kritik, 2010
 (ed.): Landerziehungsheim-Pädagogik, Reformpädagogische Schulkonzepte, vol. 2, Baltmannsweiler : Schneider, 2012 
 mit Wolfgang Thöner, Adriane Feustel (ed.): Entfernt : Frauen des Bauhauses während der NS-Zeit – Verfolgung und Exil. Munich : edition text + kritik, 2012 
 mit Sylvia Asmus, Germaine Goetzinger, Hiltrud Häntzschel (ed.): Auf unsicherem Terrain. Briefeschreiben im Exil. Munich : edition text + kritik, 2013
 with Hildegard Feidel-Mertz (ed.): Hilde Jarecki: Spielgruppen – Ein praxisbezogener Zugang. Bad Heilbrunn : Julius Klinkhardt, 2014 
 with Irene Below, Maria Kublitz-Kramer (ed.): Das Ende des Exils? Briefe von Frauen nach 1945. München : edition text + kritik, 2015, 
 with Irene Below, Hiltrud Häntzschel, Maria Kublitz-Kramer (ed.): Fluchtorte – Erinnerungsorte. Sanary-sur-Mer, Les Milles, Marseille. Munich : edition text + kritik, 2017 
 Lisa Seiden: "Bleib immer mit deinem Bruder zusammen! : eine Geschichte vom "Kindertransport". Herausgegeben und mit einem Nachwort von Inge Hansen-Schaberg. Übersetzung aus dem Spanischen von Dieter Heymann. Berlin : Hentrich, 2018

References

External links 
 
 

Academic staff of the Technical University of Berlin
German women educators
1954 births
Living people
People from Flensburg